Most Holy Trinity Catholic Cemetery is a cemetery in East Hampton, New York that is the burial ground for the paternal ancestors and relatives of First Lady of the United States Jacqueline Kennedy Onassis.

The cemetery on Cedar Street north of the village is associated with Most Holy Trinity (formerly Saint Philomena) Roman Catholic Church in East Hampton although it is a mile north of the church.

Jacqueline Kennedy Onassis, who was born nearby at Southampton Hospital, spent her summers until age 10 at her grandfather's home called Lasata. She is buried not at Most Holy Trinity but next to her first husband, President John F. Kennedy, in Arlington National Cemetery.

Notable burials

 John Vernou Bouvier III (1891–1957) – Jacqueline Kennedy Onassis' father
 John Vernou Bouvier Jr. (1865–1948) – Jacqueline Kennedy Onassis' paternal grandfather
 Edith Ewing Bouvier Beale (1895–1977) – Jacqueline  Kennedy Onassis' aunt immortalized in the documentary Grey Gardens
 Philip Barry, Sr. (1896–1949) – Author
 Lee Bouvier Radziwill (1933–2019) – Jacqueline Kennedy Onassis' sister

References

External links
 
 

Roman Catholic cemeteries in New York (state)
East Hampton (town), New York
Cemeteries in Suffolk County, New York